Military History Museum Piešťany (Slovak: Vojenské historické múzeum Piešťany, abbreviation VHM Piešťany) is a military museum in Piešťany in western Slovakia.

It is located in Piešťany Airport in buildings of former military base. It was opened in 2004. Expositions of the museum are focused on aircraft and vehicles of the Czechoslovak army between years 1945 and 1992. As of 31 December 2019, the Piešťany Museum Department registered 9,272 collection items in the collection fund, which are part of 22 museum collections.

Exhibits include several Migs-29, many Migs-21, Migs-23, different Sukhoi aircraft, several T-34, T-55 and T-72 tanks and many others vehicles and aircraft which served in Czechoslovak and Slovak armies.

References

Museums in Trnava Region
Piešťany